Sidique Sataca Ismail Mussagi (born 24 October 1993) is a Mozambican footballer who plays as a defender for GD Maputo and the Mozambique national football team.

Career

International
Mussagi made his senior international debut on 23 June 2012, playing the entirety of a 1-0 friendly defeat to Vietnam.

Career statistics

International

References

External links

1993 births
Living people
GD Maputo players
Moçambola players
Mozambican footballers
Mozambique international footballers
Association football defenders